The Super Snooper is a 1952 Warner Bros. Looney Tunes cartoon directed by Robert McKimson. The cartoon was released on November 1, 1952, and stars Daffy Duck as a detective.

Plot
Daffy Duck is Duck Drake, a "Private Eye, Ear, Nose, and Throat". He receives a call that summons him to the J. Cleaver Axe-Handle Estate, where somebody supposedly has been murdered. He arrives at the house and suspects a female duck with red hair and a curve hugging red dress of committing the crime. The woman, referred to as 'Shapely Lady Duck' shows him affection; saying "Rowr! Rowr! Oh baby! You gorgeous hunk of duck," and showers him with kisses. However, Drake, is only interested in inquiring about the murder.

Drake immediately accuses her of hating the deceased and drawing her "little pistol" out of her bag (the gun is a revolver with a very long barrel but somehow fits inside a change purse), pointing it at him and slowly squeezing the trigger, tighter and tighter and tighter...until six rounds plug Drake right in the face. At first the bullets appear to have decapitated him until his head sticks out from his jacket with his beak full of holes and proclaims loudly "Not so TIGHT!" He then elaborates (after she hikes up her skirt to reveal her long curvaceous legs, turns the lights out and plants numerous kisses on him) how 'Shapely Lady Duck' grabbed the deer rifle off the wall, prompting the man (having apparently survived the pistol shots) to run screaming from the room then letting him have it when he tries to sneak out. Drake is shot multiple times while mimicking a game dummy so that the scoreboard goes from 5 to 200 before eventually saying "Pretty good shooting, sister".

The woman insists that he searches her and kisses him on the lips two more times. Amazingly, the target is still alive and kicking so the next scene involves her crushing him with a grand piano suspended from the ceiling. Drake predictably ends up on the receiving end of this reenactment after startling the woman into releasing the rope holding up the piano, which falls and crushes him through the floor, leaving him with piano keys for teeth. Even though the victim has been shot twice and squished by a piano, he is still defiantly clinging on to life, with the love struck duck getting another chance to kiss him on the cheek. This results in a last desperate attempt to kill him by moving nearby train tracks to the front door because the victim always watched the 5:15 express go past every day. At that precise time Drake opens the door and is flattened by the oncoming train, which derails and leaves him with a lantern on his head. After insulting the driver, he makes the shocking discovery that he is in the wrong house. "Silly boy! The ax handle estate is a couple of blocks up the street," Shapely Lady Duck tells him.

Finally accepting that the seductress is innocent, he is further stunned when she claims being guilty "Of being crazy about you sweatheart!" Drake, having ignored her advances throughout the entire episode, notices the "old ball and chain" look in her eye (quite literally) and flees. He runs right through the front door. Not giving up on her 'cutie pie,' Shapely Lady Duck hikes up her skirt and chases after him, also breaking through the front door which now houses their bride and groom imprints.

Home media
The Super Snooper can be found on Disc 1 of the 2007 DVD set Looney Tunes Golden Collection: Volume 5.

See also
 List of Daffy Duck cartoons

References

External links
 
 

1952 animated films
1952 short films
1952 films
Looney Tunes shorts
Films directed by Robert McKimson
Daffy Duck films
1950s Warner Bros. animated short films
Films scored by Carl Stalling
1950s English-language films
American detective films